Hello Kitty's Furry Tale Theater is an animated series based on the Japanese character Hello Kitty, produced by DIC Enterprises and animated by Toei Animation. The series involves Hello Kitty and her friends (and occasionally family) doing their own version of popular fairy tales and stories. Each of the 13 episodes consisted of two 11-minute cartoons, for a total of 26 "shows"; each show was a spoof of a well-known fairy tale or movie.

Characters
 Hello Kitty (voiced by Tara Charendoff) - the cheerful and kind kitten director of the theater. In many tales she is the protagonist or a supportive fairy.
 Mama Kitty (voiced by Elizabeth Hanna) – Kitty's mother, who plays motherly roles in the tales.
 Papa Kitty (voiced by Len Carlson) - Kitty's father, who plays fatherly roles in the tales.
 Grandma Kitty (voiced by Elizabeth Hanna) - Kitty's grandmother. She casts as supporting roles in the tales.
 Grandpa Kitty (voiced by Carl Banas) - Kitty's grandfather. He casts as supporting roles in the tales.
 Tuxedo Sam (voiced by Sean Roberge) - a happy penguin stage helper of the theater. In many tales he is the protagonist or Kitty's sidekick or love interest.
 My Melody (voiced by Mairon Bennett) - a very timid supporting bunny actress who is Kitty’s best friend. Her roles are often smaller and she needs assistance to perform perfectly.
 Chip (voiced by Noam Zylberman) - a cheery supporting white seal pup actor. He has supporting roles with the protagonists.
 Catnip (voiced by Cree Summer) - a green Siamese Cat, who is the diva-like frenemy of Hello Kitty but is sociable, and does have a friendly side. She often takes the role of the antagonist in the tales (such as a mobster, Captain Hook, Count Dracula, Ebenezer Scrooge, etc.).
 Fangora (voiced by Denise Pidgeon) - a purple Siamese Cat and Catnip's mother. She sometimes fills in for the role of a secondary antagonist in the tales.
 Grinder (voiced by Greg Morton) - a dim-witted, naive and competent bulldog who often takes the role of a secondary antagonist, a bumbling accomplice to Catnip, or a supporting character sometimes. 
 Mouser (voiced by Fred Savage) - a trickster mouse who scares and plays tricks on Hello Kitty and her friends in the last episode, and is the original owner of the theater who makes a deal at the end with Kitty to all be the owners. He is very skilled at playing the pipe organ.

Format
Each episode opens with a modern theater located in the city of London, England filling up with patrons, and usually a look at some comical goings-on backstage. The play then begins (with Hello Kitty or Tuxedo Sam saying "Once upon a meow") and the stage transforms into whatever setting the story calls for, like outer space, the American Old West, the Great Depression or the Middle Ages. Each show is a light-hearted takeoff of a children's story or a popular movie. Catnip and Grinder were usually typecast as the villains.

At the end, the stage returns to normal, and the actors take their bow.

One exception to this format is the cartoon "The Phantom of the Theater", which begins after the actors have finished a show (specifically "Robin Penguin"); all the action in this story takes place backstage.

Episodes

Television broadcast

North American television debut
In the USA, Hello Kitty's Furry Tale Theater aired on September 19, 1987 on CBS.

International broadcast
In the UK, the cartoon was broadcast on the music and entertainment channel MTV from September 27, 1987.

Release

Region 1
On March 24, 1998, MGM Home Entertainment released two VHS videocassettes each containing three cartoon shorts, as well as the opening and closing sequences.
 Hello Kitty: Kitty and the Beast (also includes "Grinder Genie and the Magic Lamp", "Hello Mother Goose" and "Little Red Bunny Hood")
 Hello Kitty: Wizard of Paws (also includes "Snow White Kitty", "Sleeping Kitty" and "Peter Penguin")

In 2003-2004, MGM Home Entertainment under their MGM Kids label released 5 DVD's each containing five cartoon shorts; the only one of the 26 not to be included was "The Year Scroogenip Swiped Christmas". The opening and closing sequences are not included.
 Hello Kitty Becomes a Princess (February 4, 2003: "Cinderkitty", "Kittylocks and the Three Bears", "Sleeping Kitty", "Kitty and the Beast", "Snow White Kitty and the One Dwarf")
 Hello Kitty Goes to the Movies (February 4, 2003: "K.T. The Kitty Terrestrial", "The Wizard of Paws", "Kitty and the Kong", "Cat Wars", "Paws: The Great White Dog Shark")
 Hello Kitty Saves the Day (February 4, 2003: "Peter Penguin", "Tar-Sam of the Jungle", "Paws of the Round Table", "Crocodile Penguin", "Grinder Genie and the Magic Lamp")
 Hello Kitty Plays Pretend (February 17, 2004: "The Phantom of the Theater", "Frankencat", "Catula", "The Pawed Piper", "Rumpeldogskin")
 Hello Kitty Tells Fairy Tales (February 17, 2004: "Robin Penguin", "Hello Mother Goose", "The Ugly Quackling", "Pinocchio Penguin", "Little Red Bunny Hood")

Region 2
The same DVDs that were released in the United States were released in Region 2 by MGM Home Entertainment and 20th Century Fox Home Entertainment. Becomes a Princess, Goes to the Movies and Saves the Day were all released in September 2004, using the same prints as the US versions without the opening and closing sequences.

Plays Pretend and Tells Fairy Tales were not released in the United Kingdom until October 2012. These prints are not the same as the US versions, and do include the opening and closing sequences. Another DVD titled Hello Kitty Has Fun at Halloween was also released in the same year, featuring 3 episodes from Plays Pretend and an episode from Goes to the Movies. A boxset was also released, featuring all 5 of the original DVDs.

References

External links
 
Hello Kitty's Furry Tale Theater episode guide at the Big Cartoon DataBase
Hello Kitty's Furry Tale Theater at Toonarific.com

Hello Kitty
1987 American television series debuts
1987 American television series endings
1980s American animated television series
1987 Canadian television series debuts
1987 Canadian television series endings
1980s Canadian animated television series
1987 anime television series debuts
American children's animated adventure television series
American children's animated comedy television series
American children's animated fantasy television series
Canadian children's animated adventure television series
Canadian children's animated comedy television series
Canadian children's animated fantasy television series
Japanese children's animated adventure television series
Japanese children's animated comedy television series
Japanese children's animated fantasy television series
English-language television shows
Animated television series about cats
Animated television series about children
Television series by DIC Entertainment
Television series by MGM Television
CBS original programming